Peristera (feminine form of pigeon), also Aspro, locally Xero (meaning dry), Eudemia in antiquity, is a Greek island in the Sporades. It is administratively part of the municipality of Alonnisos and is also directly east of the namesake island. , the resident population of the island was 30. Peristera is in Zone B of the Alonnisos Marine Park.

Nearest islands and islets
Its nearest islands and islets are Alonnisos to the north and west and Adelfoi Islets to the west.

References

External links
Peristera on GTP Travel Pages 
Official website of Municipality of Alonnisos 

Landforms of the Sporades
Islands of Thessaly